The German 18th Infantry Division was formed on 1 October 1934 as Infanterieführer III in Liegnitz and renamed 18. Infanterie-Division on 15 October 1935. Mobilized in August 1939 it participated in the Invasion of Poland and in 1940 in the Battle of France. After the French campaign the division was motorized and redesignated 18th Motorized Infantry Division on 1 November 1940 serving on the Eastern Front for the remainder of the war. In June 1943 the division was redesignated 18th Panzergrenadier Division.

German 18th Infantry Division

From September 1939 until May 1940 the division fought in Invasion of Poland and then made up part of the occupation force.
 From May 1940 until November 1940 the division fought in the Battle of France and then made up part of the occupation force when it was redesignated 18th Motorised Infantry Division.

German 18th Motorized Infantry Division

Formed 1 November 1940
 Part of the occupation force in France from November 1940 until June 1941.
 Fought on the Eastern Front, central sector from June 1941 until January 1942.
 Fought on the Eastern front, northern sector from January 1942 until June 1943 when it was redesignated 18th Panzergrenadier Division.

German 18th Panzergrenadier Division

Formed on 23 June 1943.
 Fought on the Eastern front, northern sector from June 1943 until October 1943.
 Fought on the Eastern front, central sector from October 1943 until September 1944. It was devastated in the Soviet 1944 summer offensive.
 The remnants of the division fought in Eastern Prussia and in the Battle of Berlin. The survivors tried to fight their way out of Berlin on 2 May 1945 when Berlin surrendered to the Soviets.

Commanding officers

18. Infanterie-Division 
 Generalleutnant Hermann Hoth, 1 October 1934 – 1 April 1938
 Generalleutnant Erich von Manstein, 1 April 1938 – 26 August 1939
 Generalleutnant Friedrich-Carl Cranz, 26 August 1939 – 1 November 1940

18. Infanterie-Division (mot.) 
 Generalleutnant Friedrich-Carl Cranz, 1 November 1940 – 24 March 1941
 General der Infanterie Friedrich Herrlein, 24 March – 15 December 1941
 General der Infanterie Werner von Erdmannsdorff, 15 December 1941 – 23 June 1943

18. Panzergrenadier-Division 
 General der Infanterie Werner von Erdmannsdorff, 23 June 1943 – 9 August 1943
 Generalleutnant Karl Zutavern, 9 August 1943 – 14 April 1944
 General der Artillerie Curt Jahn, 14 April 1944 – 24 May 1944
 Generalleutnant Karl Zutavern, 24 May 1944 – 6 July 1944
 Generalleutnant Dr. Hans Boelsen, 6 July 1944 – 1 January 1945
 Generalmajor Josef Rauch, 1 January – 8 May 1945

References
 
 

0*018
Military units and formations established in 1934
1934 establishments in Germany
Military units and formations disestablished in 1945